The following lists the top 100 singles of 2001 in Australia from the Australian Recording Industry Association (ARIA) End of Year singles chart.

"Can't Fight the Moonlight" by LeAnn Rimes was the biggest song of the year, peaking at #1 for six weeks and staying in the top 50 for 22 weeks. The longest stay at #1 was joint by Shaggy with "Angel" which spent 8 weeks at the top spot, and it was joint by Alien Ant Farm's "Smooth Criminal".

Notes

References

Australian record charts
2001 in Australian music
2001 record charts